The southern New Guinea blind snake (Ramphotyphlops bipartitus''') is a species of snake in the Typhlopidae family.

References
 

Ramphotyphlops
Reptiles described in 1879